Josh Dobson (born July 19, 1981) is an American politician, currently serving as North Carolina Commissioner of Labor. He previously served in the North Carolina House of Representatives.

Early life and education
Dobson was born on July 19, 1981 in North Carolina. He grew up in Avery County, and graduated from Avery High School. He then went to McDowell Technical Community College, where he completed an associate’s degree; Gardner-Webb University, where he got a bachelor’s degree; and Appalachian State University, where he earned a master’s degree in public administration. He was appointed to the North Carolina House of Representatives on January 29, 2013, after Mitch Gillespie resigned.
Before becoming a State Representative, Dobson was a county commissioner for McDowell County.

Legislative tenure

2014 election
Dobson was unopposed in the Republican primary, and he defeated JR Edwards in the general election.

2016 election
Dobson was unopposed in both the Republican primary and the general election.

2018 election
Dobson was unopposed in the Republican primary, and he defeated Howard Larsen in the general election.

Commissioner of Labor

2020 election
In May 2019, Dobson decided to run for North Carolina Commissioner of Labor. He defeated Democrat Jessica Holmes in the November 2020 general election. He assumed office on January 2, 2021.

Tenure 
On December 6, 2022, Dobson announced that he would not seek reelection or election to any other public office in 2024.

References

|-

 

1981 births
21st-century American politicians
Living people
Republican Party members of the North Carolina House of Representatives
North Carolina Commissioners of Labor